This is a list of racetracks which have hosted IndyCar Series racing.

Since 1996, INDYCAR events have been held on 45 different tracks – 24 ovals, 10 road courses, 10 street circuits, and 1 combined road course. – spread across five countries: the United States, Japan, Canada, Australia, and Brazil.

Circuits 

The "Map" column shows a diagram of the circuit configuration.
The "Type" column refers to the type of circuit.  An oval is an oval-shaped racing facility. A road course is a permanent motor racetrack, too, but features both left and right turns.  A street circuit is composed of temporarily closed-off public roads or airport runways. A combined road course is a racing facility that features a road course that is linked to the oval track.

Timeline

Notes

See also 
List of motor racing venues by capacity
List of Indycar races
List of Champ Car circuits

 
Racetracks
Lists of motorsport venues
Lists of sports venues in the United States